Shannon Rusca is a former professional Australian rules football player.

Early life
Rusca began playing senior Australian Football with Southern Districts in the Northern Territory Football League.

AFL career
He was listed on the rookie list by the Brisbane Lions in 2000 before being elevated during the season. During the 2000 AFL season he played two matches.

Rusca was traded to the Western Bulldogs for selection 49 in the 2001 AFL Draft. He did not play a senior match for the Bulldogs.

Post AFL
Rusca played for the Northern Territory Thunder in the Queensland AFL and Southern Districts in the NTFL.

Rusca was a playing coach with Southern Districts during the 2008/2009 NTFL season.

References

External links

1980 births
Brisbane Lions players
Southern Districts Football Club players
Indigenous Australian players of Australian rules football
Australian rules footballers from the Northern Territory
Living people
West Adelaide Football Club players